The 1921–22 Todd Shipyards F.C. season was the first season for Todd Shipyards F.C. and its first season in the American Soccer League. The Todd Shipyards Corporation had previously fielded the professional Robins Dry Dock F.C. and the amateur Tebo Yacht Basin F.C. The company combined the clubs to form Todd Shipyards F.C. and entered that club in the American Soccer League.

Todd Shipyards F.C. finished 3rd in the league. The company decided not to operate a team the following season and their spot was filled by the Brooklyn Wanderers a month into the 1922-23 season.

American Soccer League

Pld = Matches played; W = Matches won; D = Matches drawn; L = Matches lost; GF = Goals for; GA = Goals against; Pts = Points

National Challenge Cup

Southern New York State Football Association Cup

Notes and references
Bibliography

Footnotes

Todd Shipyards F.C.
American Soccer League (1921–1933) seasons
Todd Shipyards F.C.